NGC 3313 is a large barred spiral galaxy located about 55 megaparsecs (180 million light-years) away in the constellation Hydra. It was discovered by astronomer Ormond Stone in 1886 and is an outlying member of the Hydra Cluster.

Physical characteristics
NGC 3313 has a complete inner ring feature that is elongated along the bar axis of the galaxy. Inside the inner ring, there are two weak dust lanes in the bar, and surrounding the nucleus there is a very circular nuclear ring. Spiral structure breaking off from the ring region has a complex structure and is tightly wrapped around the ring. The arms trail out into the outer disk where they form a well-defined two-armed pattern. The two-armed pattern also appears to take the form of an R1' outer pseudoring. Beyond this two-armed pattern, there are numerous spiral segments which extend to much larger distances.

See also 
 List of NGC objects (3001–4000)
 NGC 1433
 NGC 1097

References

External links

Hydra Cluster
Hydra (constellation)
Barred spiral galaxies
3313 
31551 
Astronomical objects discovered in 1886
Discoveries by Ormond Stone
UGCA objects